Cathróe is the twelfth alleged Bishop of St. Andrews according to the bishop-list of Walter Bower. He is one of 4 bishops-elect listed by Bower; that is, he is the second of Giric, Cathróe, Eadmer and Godric. As with the other 3, Bower is our only source. As the list is in chronological order, only Cathróe can have been bishop elect before Turgot of Durham was elected bishop in 1107, with Eadmer being bishop-elect in 1120 after the death of Turgot. It has been suggested too that Eadmer and Godric are the same people.

Notes

References
Broun, Dauvit, "Recovering the Full Text of Version A of the Foundation Legend", in Simon Taylor (ed.) Kings, Clerics and Chronicles in Scotland, 500–1297, (Dublin, 2000), pp. 108–14
Dowden, John, The Bishops of Scotland, ed. J. Maitland Thomson, (Glasgow, 1912)
Dumville, David N., "St Cathróe of Metz and the Hagiography of Exoticism," in Irish Hagiography: Saints and Scholars, ed. John Carey et al. (Dublin, 2001), pp. 172–188
MacQueen, John, MacQueen, Winifred & Watt, D.E.R. (eds.), Scottichronicon by Walter Bower in Latin and English, Vol. 3, (Aberdeen, 1995)
Watt, D.E.R., (ed.) Fasti Ecclesia Scoticanae Medii Aevii ad annum 1638, (Scottish Records Society, 1969)

11th-century births
12th-century deaths
Bishops of St Andrews
Medieval Gaels from Scotland
11th-century Scottish Roman Catholic bishops
12th-century Scottish Roman Catholic bishops